Cartel ships, in international law, are ships employed on humanitarian voyages, in particular, to carry communications or prisoners between belligerents. They fly distinctive flags, including a flag of truce. Traditionally, they were unarmed but for a single gun retained for signalling purposes. Cartel ships were used on the basis of intergovernmental agreements, which were called 'cartels' between the 17th and the 19th century.

A ship serving as a cartel was not subject to seizure or capture. However, if it engaged in commerce or warlike acts such as carrying official dispatches or messengers, it lost its character of inviolability and would then be subject to capture. The cartel protection extended to the return voyage. Furthermore, the prisoners being taken for exchange were under an obligation not to engage in hostilities towards their captors. If they were to capture the cartel ship, they would have no rights to salvage, and the owner of the vessel, if it were a ship from their country, would have no right to reclaim the vessel. 

During the War of 1812 the British Admiralty wrote to the United States Government that Great Britain would not accept as valid cartel agreements made on the high seas. On 10 June 1813, USS President captured the outward-bound Falmouth packet , Captain Aaron Groub Blewett, which managed to throw her mails overboard before President could send a prize crew aboard. President made a cartel of Duke of Montrose, putting all of Presidents prisoners from three earlier captures on board and then sending her and her now 79 passengers and crew into Falmouth under the command of an American officer. There the British government refused to recognize the cartel agreement that Blewett, his crew, and passengers had signed. Rather than turn Duke of Montrose over to the Agent for American Prisoners, the British government instructed Blewett to resume command of his ship and prepare her to sail again. 

Known colloquially as "The Great White Whale", Canberra ferried 4,000 Argentinian prisoners of war from the islands to Puerto Madryn, Argentina, from East Falkland after the cessation of hostilities, and was appointed a cartel ship by the Red Cross representative Hugo Berchtold, then present in the islands.

Citations and references
Citations

References
 
  
 

Law of the sea
Prize warfare